Last Day of Summer is the debut commercial mixtape by American singer Summer Walker. It was released on October 19, 2018, by LVRN and Interscope Records.

Singles
On April 5, 2018, they released the first single "CPR". On July 26, they released the second single "Girls Need Love". On February 27, 2019, they released "Girls Need Love (Remix)" with Drake. The single charted at number 37 on the Billboard Hot 100.

Critical reception
Critics reviewed the mixtape well upon release. Vanyaland wrote that "Walker is ready and set for the next chapter of her life. Having been signed by LVRN accompanied by Interscope Records is enough proof that Walker’s resilience and motivation is paying off. Most who are just tuning into Walker should have came up with the same conclusion — that she isn’t anything less than dope. Last Day Of Summer is a 12-song effort packed with nothing but female truth that for most would seem too provocative." Editor for DJBooth, Donna-Claire Chesman, mentioned that the album "brought it to jazzy life on her latest and most successful body of work" and "skimmed across a vast pool of emotion." Chuck Ramos for Ones To Watch commented on the album saying it "is a collection of songs that showcase the talented vocalist’s ability as a songwriter. Her debut is a transparent display of her thoughts and feelings on confidence, doubt, love and womanhood. Tapping into an array of styles for production, Walker shatters any preconceived ideas about her sound being one dimensional."

Commercial performance
Last Day of Summer peaked at number 44 on the Billboard 200 chart and number 25 on the Top R&B/Hip-Hop Albums chart on November 3, 2018, selling 5,630 album-equivalent units in its first week.

Track listing

Charts

Weekly charts

Year-end charts

References

2018 mixtape albums
Debut mixtape albums
Summer Walker albums